The 2006–07 season of the Portuguese Futsal First Division was the 17th season of top-tier futsal in Portugal, and was won by Benfica.

Teams
 FC Alpendorada
 CF Belenenses
 SL Benfica
 Boavista FC
 AR Freixieiro
 FJ Antunes
 AD Fundão
 ARCD Junqueira
 Modicus
 Odivelas
 SL Olivais
 Sporting CP
 SC Braga
 SC Pombal

League table

Play-offs 

Extra Time = *

Quarter-finals

Semi-finals

Final

Play-out

Each team started with half of the points conquered in the regular phase.

External links
www.fpf.pt

Futsal
Portuguese Futsal First Division seasons
Portugal